Dan Friedman (1945– July 6, 1995) was an American educator, graphic and furniture designer. He was a major contributor to the postmodern and new wave typography movements.

Early life and education

In 1945, Dan Friedman was born in Cleveland, Ohio. He graduated from the Carnegie Institute of Technology. After that, he studied at the Ulm School of Design. There, he studied graphic design. He also studied at Schule für Gestaltung Basel. There, he studied under Wolfgang Weingart and Armin Hofmann. In 1969 he moved back to the United States.

Career

Upon returning to America, Friedman was senior designer at Anspach Grossman Portugal, from 1975 to 1977. For three years, from 1970–73, he taught at Yale University. From 1972-1975, he was the chairman of the board for the design department at State University of New York at Purchase. Friedman designed posters, letterheads, logos, and more, while working for Pentagram, from 1979 until 1984. Clients included Citibank and Williwear. He used found objects to create Day-Glo furniture. In 1982 he designed a book for his friend, Keith Haring. He did work for the Neotu Gallery.

Starting in 1994 he was the Frank Stanton Professor of Graphic Design at the Cooper Union.

Death and legacy

He died of AIDS in 1995 at St. Luke's-Roosevelt Hospital Center, New York City.

His work is held in the collection of the Cooper-Hewitt, National Design Museum and the Museum of Modern Art.

Bibliography

with Jeffrey Dietch, Steven Holt and Alessandro Mendini. Dan Friedman: Radical Modernism. New Haven: Yale University Press (1994). .
with Jeffrey Dietch. Post Human. Pully/Lausanne: FAE Musée d'Art Contemporain (1992).

References

External links
Interview with Dan Friedman, 1994, Eye 14

1945 births
1995 deaths
American art writers
20th-century American educators
American furniture designers
American graphic designers
American typographers and type designers
Carnegie Mellon University College of Fine Arts alumni
Cooper Union faculty
Artists from Cleveland
People from Manhattan
State University of New York faculty
Yale University faculty
AIDS-related deaths in New York (state)
20th-century American writers
AIGA medalists